The muskrat (Ondatra zibethicus) is a medium-sized semiaquatic rodent native to North America and an introduced species in parts of Europe, Asia, and South America. The muskrat is found in wetlands over a wide range of climates and habitats. It has important effects on the ecology of wetlands, and is a resource of food and fur for humans.

They are covered with short, thick fur of medium to dark brown color. Their long tails, covered with scales rather than hair, are their main means of propulsion. Muskrats spend most of their time in the water and can swim under water for 12 to 17 minutes. They live in families, consisting of a male and female pair and their young. To protect themselves from the cold and from predators, they build nests that are often burrowed into the bank with an underwater entrance. Muskrats feed mostly on cattail and other aquatic vegetation but also eat small animals.

Ondatra zibethicus is the only species in the genus Ondatra and tribe Ondatrini. It is the largest species in the subfamily Arvicolinae, which includes 142 other species of rodents, mostly voles and lemmings. Muskrats are referred to as "rats" in a general sense because they are medium-sized rodents with an adaptable lifestyle and an omnivorous diet. They are not, however, members of the genus Rattus. They are not closely related to beavers, with which they share habitat and general appearance.

Etymology 
The muskrat's name probably comes from a word of Algonquian (possibly Powhatan) origin, muscascus (literally "it is red", so called for its colorings), or from the Abenaki native word mòskwas, as seen in the archaic English name for the animal, musquash. Because of the association with the "musky" odor, which the muskrat uses to mark its territory, and its flattened tail, the name became altered to musk-beaver; later it became "muskrat" due to its resemblance to rats.

Similarly, its specific name zibethicus means "musky", being the adjective of zibethus "civet musk; civet". The genus name comes from the Huron word for the animal, ondathra, and entered New Latin as Ondatra via French.

Description 
That is about four times the weight of the brown rat (Rattus norvegicus), though an adult muskrat is only slightly longer. It is almost certainly the largest and heaviest member of the diverse family Cricetidae, which includes all voles, lemmings, and most mice native to the Americas, and hamsters in Eurasia. The muskrat is much smaller than a beaver (Castor canadensis), with which they often share habitat.

Muskrats are covered with short, thick fur, which is medium to dark brown or black in color, with the belly a bit lighter (countershaded); as the animal ages, it turns partly gray. The fur has two layers, which provides protection from cold water. They have long tails covered with scales rather than hair. To aid in swimming, their tails are slightly flattened vertically, a shape that is unique to them. When they walk on land, their tails drag on the ground, which makes their tracks easy to recognize.

Muskrats spend most of their time in water and are well suited to their semiaquatic life. They can swim underwater for 12 to 17 minutes. Their bodies, like those of seals and whales, are less sensitive to the buildup of carbon dioxide than those of most other mammals. They can close off their ears to keep water out. Their hind feet are webbed and are their main means of propulsion. Their tail functions as a rudder, controlling the direction they swim in.

Distribution and ecology 

Muskrats are found over most of Canada and the United States and a small part of northern Mexico. They were introduced to Europe in the beginning of the 20th century and have become an invasive species in northwestern Europe. They mostly inhabit wetlands, areas in or near saline and freshwater wetlands, rivers, lakes, or ponds. They are not found in Florida, where the round-tailed muskrat, or Florida water rat (Neofiber alleni), fills their ecological niche.

Their populations naturally cycle; in areas where they become abundant, they are capable of removing much of the vegetation in wetlands. They are thought to play a major role in determining the vegetation of prairie wetlands in particular. They also selectively remove preferred plant species, thereby changing the abundance of plant species in many kinds of wetlands. Species commonly eaten include cattail and yellow water lily. Alligators are thought to be an important natural predator, and the absence of muskrats from Florida may in part be the result of alligator predation.

While much wetland habitat has been eliminated due to human activity, new muskrat habitat has been created by the construction of canals or irrigation channels (e.g., acequias), and the muskrat remains common and widespread. They are able to live alongside streams which contain the sulfurous water that drains away from coal mines. Fish and frogs perish in such streams, yet muskrats may thrive and occupy the wetlands. Muskrats also benefit from human persecution of some of their predators.

The muskrat is classed as a "prohibited new organism" under New Zealand's Hazardous Substances and New Organisms Act 1996, preventing it from being imported into the country.

The trematode Metorchis conjunctus can also infect muskrats.

Subspecies 

Ondatra zibethicus has 16 subspecies: O.z. albus, O.z. aquihnis, O.z. bemardi, O.z. cinnamominus, O.z. macrodom, O.z. mergens, O.z. obscurus, O.z. occipitalis, O.z. osoyoosensis, O.z. pallidus, O.z.ripensis, O.z. rivalicus, O.z. roidmani, O.z. spatulatus, O.z. zalaphus and O.z. zibethicus.

Invasiveness status 
In Europe, the muskrat has been included in the list of invasive alien species of Union concern (the Union list) since August 2, 2017. This implies that this species cannot be imported, bred, transported, commercialized, or intentionally released into the environment in the whole of the European Union.

Behavior 

Muskrats normally live in families consisting of a male and female and their young. During the spring, they often fight with other muskrats over territory and potential mates. Many are injured or killed in these fights. Muskrat families build nests to protect themselves and their young from cold and predators. In streams, ponds, or lakes, muskrats burrow into the bank with an underwater entrance. In marshes, push-ups are constructed from vegetation and mud. In snowy areas, they keep the openings to their push-ups closed by plugging them with vegetation, which they replace every day. Some muskrat push-ups are swept away in spring floods and have to be replaced each year. Muskrats also build feeding platforms in wetlands. They help maintain open areas in marshes, which helps to provide habitat for aquatic birds.

Muskrats are most active at night or near dawn and dusk. They feed on cattail and other aquatic vegetation. They do not store food for the winter, but sometimes eat the insides of their push-ups. While they may appear to steal food beavers have stored, more seemingly cooperative partnerships with beavers exist, as featured in the BBC David Attenborough wildlife documentary The Life of Mammals. Plant materials compose about 95% of their diets, but they also eat small animals, such as freshwater mussels, frogs, crayfish, fish, and small turtles. Muskrats follow trails they make in swamps and ponds. When the water freezes, they continue to follow their trails under the ice. 

Muskrats provide an important food resource for many other animals, including mink, foxes, cougars, coyotes, wolves, lynx, bobcats, raccoons, bears, wolverines, eagles, snakes, alligators, bull sharks, large owls, and hawks. Otters, snapping turtles, herons, bullfrogs, large fish such as pike and largemouth bass, and predatory land reptiles such as monitor lizards prey on baby muskrats. Caribou, moose, and elk sometimes feed on the vegetation which makes up muskrat push-ups during the winter when other food is scarce for them. In their introduced range in the former Soviet Union, the muskrat's greatest predator is the golden jackal. They can be completely eradicated in shallow water bodies, and during the winter of 1948–49 in the Amu Darya (river in central Asia), muskrats constituted 12.3% of jackal faeces contents, and 71% of muskrat houses were destroyed by jackals, 16% of which froze and became unsuitable for muskrat occupation. Jackals also harm the muskrat industry by eating muskrats caught in traps or taking skins left out to dry.

Muskrats, like most rodents, are prolific breeders. Females can have two or three litters a year of six to eight young each. In southern environments, young muskrats mature in six months, while in colder northern environments, it takes about a year. Muskrat populations appear to go through a regular pattern of rise and dramatic decline spread over a six- to 10-year period. Some other rodents, including famously the muskrat's close relatives the lemmings, go through the same type of population changes.

In human history 
Native Americans have long considered the muskrat to be a very important animal. Some predict winter snowfall levels by observing the size and timing of muskrat lodge construction.

In several Native American creation myths, the muskrat dives to the bottom of the primordial sea to bring up the mud from which the earth is created, after other animals have failed in the task.

Muskrats have sometimes been a food resource for North Americans. In the southeastern portion of Michigan, a longstanding dispensation allows Catholics to consume muskrat as their Friday penance, on Ash Wednesday, and on Lenten Fridays (when the eating of flesh, except for fish, is prohibited); this tradition dates back to at least the early 19th century. In 2019, it was reported that a series of muskrat dinners were held during Lent in the areas along the Detroit River, with up to 900 muskrats being consumed at a single dinner. The preparation involved the removal of the musk glands and the gutting and cleaning of the carcass, before the meat was parboiled for four hours with onion and garlic and finally fried.

Muskrat fur is warm, becoming prime at the beginning of December in northern North America. In the early 20th century, the trapping of the animal for its fur became an important industry there. During that era, the fur was specially trimmed and dyed to be sold widely in the US as "Hudson seal" fur. Muskrats were introduced at that time to Europe as a fur resource, and spread throughout northern Europe and Asia.

In some European countries, such as Belgium, France, and the Netherlands, the muskrat is considered an invasive pest, as its burrowing damages the dikes and levees on which these low-lying countries depend for protection from flooding. In those countries, it is trapped, poisoned, and hunted to attempt to keep the population down. Muskrats also eat corn and other farm and garden crops growing near water bodies.

Royal Canadian Mounted Police winter hats are made from muskrat fur.

References

External links

 
 Everything Muskrat
 How Muskrat Created the World – Native American Legends 

Arctic land animals
Fauna of the Great Lakes region (North America)
Mammals described in 1766
Mammals of North America
Mammals of the Arctic
Semiaquatic mammals
Taxa named by Carl Linnaeus
Voles and lemmings